Wonowon is a community in northeastern British Columbia, Canada, located at Mile 101 on Highway 97, the Alaska Highway. The present-day community name is derived from the mile number, "one-oh-one", however, the area was historically known as Blueberry. The community is part of the Peace River Regional District. The major business center for residents is Fort St. John, and the residents observe the same clock time as Fort St. John, including its abstinence from daylight saving time.

Climate
Wonowon has a subarctic climate.

Facilities 

Wonowon offers overnight accommodation, a gas station, grocery store, mobile home park, and parking lanes for long trucks. The thru-road Alaska Highway has been paved in the village area since 1982.

References

See also
 List of places with numeric names

Unincorporated settlements in British Columbia
Populated places in the Peace River Regional District
Peace River Country